The enolase superfamily is a superfamily of enzymes, members of which catalyse a range of reactions. 

The enolase superfamily includes enzymes that catalyse a wide variety of reactions and performing diverse roles in metabolism. However, the reactions catalysed share the common chemical step of abstraction of a proton from a carbon adjacent to a carboxylic acid and a requirement of a divalent metal ion. This diversity of functions is in contrast to many families of enzymes whose members catalyse similar chemical reactions on different substrates.

Members 
 Enolase
 Mandelate racemase (MR)
 Muconate lactonizing enzyme (MLE)

The primary sequences of MR and MLE, approximately 25% identical, are related but significantly different; whereas their three-dimensional structures are similar. The enzyme enolase has a more distant, but nevertheless clear, relationship to MLE and MR.   The enolase superfamily has served as a model superfamily for understanding enzyme function and is one of the protein families under study by the Enzyme Function Initiative (EFI).

References

External links 
Evolution of an enzyme active site: the structure of a new crystal form of muconate lactonizing enzyme compared with mandelate racemase and enolase.
Enolase Superfamily overview from the EFI

Enzymes
Enols
Protein superfamilies